The 2012 Women's EuroHockey Junior Championships was the 16th edition of the Women's EuroHockey Junior Championship, an under 21 women's field hockey tournament. It was held in 's-Hertogenbosch, Netherlands between 26 August and 1 September 2012.

Netherlands won the tournament by defeating Spain 9–1 in the final. England won the bronze medal by defeating Germany 3–2 in the third place playoff.

Participating nations
Alongside the host nation, 7 teams competed in the tournament.

Results

Preliminary round

Pool A

Pool B

Classification round

Fifth to eighth place classification

Pool C

First to fourth place classification

Semi-finals

Third and fourth place

Final

Statistics

Final standings

Goalscorers

References

Women's EuroHockey Junior Championship
Junior
EuroHockey Junior Championship
field hockey
International women's field hockey competitions hosted by the Netherlands
EuroHockey Junior Championship
EuroHockey Junior Championship
Sports competitions in 's-Hertogenbosch
EuroHockey Junior Championship